State Route 243 (SR 243) is a  route that serves as a connection between SR 195 east of Haleyville, Alabama, United States, with SR 24 in Russellville.

Route description
The southern terminus of SR 243 is located at its intersection with SR 195 west of Rabbittown. From this point, the route travels in a northeasterly direction to its northern terminus at its intersection with SR 24 in Russellville.

Major intersections

References

243
Transportation in Winston County, Alabama
Transportation in Franklin County, Alabama